HNE may refer to:
 Hne, a Burmese musical instrument
 4-Hydroxynonenal, produced by lipid peroxidation
 Chhattisgarhi language, spoken in India
 Hexanitroethane, an oxidizer
 Historic New England, an American historical society
 Home News Enterprises, an American publisher
 Michel Hne, New Caledonian football player
 Neutrophil elastase
 Harwich and North Essex, a UK Parliamentary Constituency
 Heure Normale de l'Est (Eastern time zone) in Canada.